

Japanese tanks and armoured vehicles
This is a list of the Japanese armoured fighting vehicles of World War II. This list includes vehicles that never left the drawing board; prototype models and production models from after World War I, into the interwar period and through the end of the Second World War.

Tankettes

Type 92 Jyu-Sokosha
Type 94 tankette
Type 97 Te-Ke tankette

Light tanks
Type 95 Ha-Go light tank
Type 98 Ke-Ni light tank
Type 2 Ke-To light tank
Type 4 Ke-Nu light tank

Medium tanks

Type 89 Chi-Ro (I-Go) medium tank
Type 97 Chi-Ha medium tank
Type 97 Shinhoto Chi-Ha improved medium tank
Type 97 Command Tank Shi-Ki 
Type 1 Chi-He medium tank
Type 3 Chi-Nu medium tank
Type 4 Chi-To medium tank
Type 5 Chi-Ri medium tank (prototype)

Heavy tanks
Type 95 heavy tank
O-I super-heavy tank (prototype)

Amphibious tanks
SR I-Go amphibious tank (prototype)
SR II Ro-Go amphibious tank (prototype)
SR III Ha-Go amphibious tank (prototype)
Type 1 Mi-Sha amphibious tank (prototype)
Type 2 Ka-Mi amphibious tank
Type 3 Ka-Chi amphibious tank
Type 5 To-Ku amphibious tank (prototype)

Self-propelled guns

Type 1 Ho-Ni I 75 mm tank destroyer
Type 1 Ho-Ni II 105 mm SPH
Type 2 Ho-I gun tank
Type 3 Ho-Ni III gun tank
Type 4 Ho-Ro 150 mm SPH
Type 4 Ha-To 30 cm SP heavy mortar carrier
Type 97 Short Barrel 120 mm gun tank
Type 5 Na-To 75 mm SP tank destroyer

Experimental tanks & self-propelled guns

Experimental tank Number 1 - Type 87 Chi-I
Experimental Type 91 heavy tank
Experimental medium tank Chi-Ni
Experimental medium tank Type 98 Chi-Ho
Experimental Ji-Ro (a/k/a Ji-Ro Sha) 10 cm SPG
Experimental Hi-Ro Sha (a/k/a Hiro-sha) 10 cm SPG
Experimental Type 98 Ta-Se 20 mm anti-aircraft tank
Experimental Type 98 20 mm AAG tank twin Type II 20 mm guns
Experimental light tank Type 3 Ke-Ri
Experimental flying tank Ku-Ro
Experimental Type 2 Ku-Se 75 mm SPG
Experimental Type 4 Ho-To 120 mm self propelled howitzer
Experimental light tank Type 5 Ke-Ho
Experimental Type 5 Ho-Ru 47 mm SP gun (similar to the German Hetzer)
Experimental Type 5 155 mm Ho-Chi SP gun
Experimental Long Barrel 120 mm SPG
Experimental Type 5 Ka-To 105 mm tank destroyer
Type 5 Ho-Ri 105 mm SP gun tank (similar to the German Ferdinand/Elefant)
Type 5 Ho-Ri II 105 mm SP gun tank (similar to the German Jagdtiger)

Armored vehicles

Sumida Amphibious Armored Car (Experimental)
Type 95 So-Ki armored railroad car
Type 2592 Chiyoda armored car
Sumida M.2593 (variants: Type 91 So-Mo armored railroad car & Sumida Model P armored car)
Type 93 armoured car a/k/a Type 2593 Hokoku, Type 93 Kokusan or "Type 92" naval armored car
Type 98 So-Da armored ammunition carrier
Type 100 Te-Re observation vehicle
Type 1 Ho-Ha half-track armoured personnel carrier
Type 1 Ho-Ki armored personnel carrier
Type 4 Chi-So armored tracked carrier
Type 4 Ka-Tsu amphibious armoured launch/personnel carrier
Type 4 Ka-Sha amphibious tank (design only)

Other vehicles

Armored engineer vehicle SS-Ki
Armored Lumberjack Ho-K
Lumber Sweeper Basso-Ki
Armored recovery vehicle Se-Ri
S B tracked swamp vehicle (prototype)
F B tracked swamp vehicle
T B tracked swamp scout vehicle
Type 94 Disinfecting Vehicle and Type 94 Gas Scattering Vehicle
Type 97 "Pole planter" and Type 97 "Cable layer"
Type 95 Crane vehicle Ri-Ki
Type 97 Disinfecting Vehicle and Type 97 Gas Scattering Vehicle
Type 97 Mini Engineer vehicle Yi-Go a/k/a Type 98 Ya-I Go
Type T-G "bridge layer"
Type 4 Work vehicle

Imported tanks and armored vehicles (including captured types)

Austin Armoured Car
Vickers Crossley armoured car
Wolseley armoured car
British Light Tank Mk IV
British Medium Whippet Mk A
Renault FT "Ko-Gata Sensha" light tank
Renault NC27 "Otsu-Gata Sensha" light tank
Carden-Loyd Mk.VI
Stuart M3 light tank – captured 
British Universal Carrier – captured
Marmon-Herrington Armoured Car – captured

See also
 Japanese tanks of World War II

References

External links
History of War.org
Taki's Imperial Japanese Army Page - Akira Takizawa